Testament of Youth is a 1979 BBC television drama based on the First World War memoir of the same name written by Vera Brittain. It was transmitted on BBC2.

The series stars Cheryl Campbell as Vera Brittain, an independent young woman from Buxton, Derbyshire, who abandons her studies at Somerville College, Oxford University to become a volunteer nurse. It features Peter Woodward as Roland Leighton, Joanna McCallum as Winifred Holtby and Emrys James and Jane Wenham as Vera's parents.

The series won five British Academy Television Awards (BAFTA). As well as her BAFTA, Campbell received a Best Actress award from the Broadcasting Press Guild. Elaine Morgan was honoured with the Writer of the Year award from the Royal Television Society for her serialisation.

Cast
 Cheryl Campbell as Vera Brittain
 Emrys James as Mr. Brittain
 Jane Wenham as Mrs. Brittain
 Peter Woodward as Roland Leighton
 Rupert Frazer as Edward Brittain
 Rosalie Crutchley as Miss Penrose
 Michael Troughton as Victor Richardson
 Geoffrey Burridge as Geoffrey Thurlow
 Frances Tomelty as Sister Hope Milroy
 Jane Booker as Nurse Sally
 Tricia George as Betty
Joanna Foster as Theresa
 June Tobin as Mrs. Leighton
 Victor Lucas as Mr. Leighton
 Joanna McCallum as Winifred Holtby

See also
 Testament of Youth (film)

References

External links
 

BBC television dramas
1970s British drama television series
1979 British television series debuts
1979 British television series endings
English-language television shows
Testament of Youth (TV series)